Maciej Szewczyk (born 12 May 1994) is a German-Polish professional footballer who plays as a defender for German club DJK Blau-Weiß Mintard.

Club career
Szewczyk joined KS Polkowice in August 2013 from Alemannia Aachen. He made his 3. Liga debut in the first game of the 2012–13 season on 15 September 2012 against SpVgg Unterhaching.

Personal life
His father Zbigniew Szewczyk is a former professional footballer.

References

External links

1994 births
People from Meppen
Footballers from Lower Saxony
Living people
German footballers
Polish footballers
Poland youth international footballers
Association football defenders
Alemannia Aachen players
Górnik Polkowice players
Bytovia Bytów players
Widzew Łódź players
VfB Speldorf players
3. Liga players
I liga players
II liga players
III liga players
Oberliga (football) players
Landesliga players